Nader Ghandri (born 18 February 1995) is a professional footballer who plays as a defender for Tunisian Ligue Professionnelle 1 club Club Africain. Born in France, he plays for the Tunisia national team.

Club career
Born in Aubervilliers, Ghandri spent his youth career with a number of Paris-based sides, playing for Ivry, Red Star and Drancy. In 2013, he signed a two-year amateur contract with Ligue 2 club AC Arles.

On 30 August 2021, he returned to Club Africain on a two-year contract.

International career
In 2015, Ghandri was a member of the Tunisia under-23 national team at the 2015 U-23 Africa Cup of Nations in Senegal, making 2 appearances in the tournament.

He made his debut for Tunisia national football team on 7 June 2019 in a friendly against Iraq, as a starter.

Career statistics

International

References

External links
 
 

1995 births
French sportspeople of Tunisian descent
Sportspeople from Aubervilliers
Citizens of Tunisia through descent
Living people
French footballers
Tunisian footballers
Association football midfielders
Tunisia under-23 international footballers
Tunisia international footballers
JA Drancy players
AC Arlésien players
Club Africain players
Red Star F.C. players
US Ivry players
Royal Antwerp F.C. players
K.V.C. Westerlo players
PFC Slavia Sofia players
Championnat National 2 players
Championnat National 3 players
Ligue 2 players
Tunisian Ligue Professionnelle 1 players
Belgian Pro League players
Challenger Pro League players
First Professional Football League (Bulgaria) players
2015 Africa U-23 Cup of Nations players
Tunisian expatriate footballers
Expatriate footballers in Belgium
Tunisian expatriate sportspeople in Belgium
Expatriate footballers in Bulgaria
Tunisian expatriate sportspeople in Bulgaria
Footballers from Seine-Saint-Denis
2022 FIFA World Cup players